Joseph or Joe Grima may refer to:

 Joseph Grima (architect), British architect, critic, and editor
 Joe Grima (politician) (1936–2017), Maltese broadcaster and politician
 Joey Grima, Australian rugby league football coach
 Joe Grima (rugby league), New Zealand rugby league footballer